Tim Littles (born November 2, 1964 in Sharon, Connecticut) was an American boxer in the super middleweight division.

Amateur career
Known as "The Doctor of Styles", Littles had a successful amateur career.

Amateur highlights
1985 United States Amateur Light middleweight champion.
1989 Won Amateur World Championship over Torsten Schmitz from Germany in a 5-round World Championship bout in Casablanca, Morocco before turning Pro in November 13, 1989

Professional career
Littles turned pro in 1989 and became a super middleweight contender during the early to mid 1990s. His name will forever be linked with his nemesis Frankie Liles who was the WBA super middleweight champion for a stretch during the 1990s. The two fought 3 times as amateurs, starting a rivalry between the two men that would last the rest of their careers. Of the three times they fought as amateurs, Liles won every fight.

Around the same time Liles also turned pro and made their way up the rankings around the same pace. It seemed inevitable they would clash again. Littles and Liles were both fringe contenders, unbeaten, and on the verge of cracking the top ten when they met for the first time in the pro ranks. Littles would win by a 12-round decision, avenging his losses as an amateur and securing his standing as a legit contender as a pro. Liles would rebound very well after the loss, winning the WBA title from Steve Little and scoring wins over Merqui Sosa and Michael Nunn. Littles also earned himself a title shot, but he was matched much tougher than Liles was when he received his title shot; pound for pound entrant James Toney stopped Littles in the fourth round, giving him his first defeat.

Tim had two comeback fights, both KO wins, and then challenged his old rival one last time for Liles' piece of the title. Liles accepted the challenge and on June 8, 1996 a war was waged, which Liles won on a third-round TKO. This was the end of their rivalry and also effectively ended Tim Littles' career. Apart from his win over Liles, Littles' best wins were over Antoine Byrd and John Scully. All three of those bouts happened in succession in what can be considered Tim's prime.

Professional boxing record

|-
|align="center" colspan=8|27 Wins (18 knockouts, 9 decisions), 3 Losses (3 knockouts)
|-
| align="center" style="border-style: none none solid solid; background: #e3e3e3"|Result
| align="center" style="border-style: none none solid solid; background: #e3e3e3"|Record
| align="center" style="border-style: none none solid solid; background: #e3e3e3"|Opponent
| align="center" style="border-style: none none solid solid; background: #e3e3e3"|Type
| align="center" style="border-style: none none solid solid; background: #e3e3e3"|Round
| align="center" style="border-style: none none solid solid; background: #e3e3e3"|Date
| align="center" style="border-style: none none solid solid; background: #e3e3e3"|Location
| align="center" style="border-style: none none solid solid; background: #e3e3e3"|Notes
|-align=center
|Loss
|
|align=left| Derrick Harmon
|TKO
|2
|03/11/2002
|align=left| Table Mountain Casino, Friant, California
|align=left|
|-
|Loss
|
|align=left| Frankie Liles
|TKO
|3
|08/06/1996
|align=left| Telewest Arena, Newcastle upon Tyne
|align=left|
|-
|Win
|
|align=left| Chris Sande
|TKO
|3
|09/03/1996
|align=left| Green Glens Arena, Millstreet, Ireland
|align=left|
|-
|Win
|
|align=left| Mike Belcher
|TKO
|1
|29/07/1995
|align=left| Rosemont Horizon, Rosemont, Illinois
|align=left|
|-
|Win
|
|align=left| Caseny Truesdale
|TKO
|5
|17/03/1995
|align=left| Worcester Memorial Auditorium, Worcester, Massachusetts
|align=left|
|-
|Loss
|
|align=left| James Toney
|TKO
|4
|05/03/1994
|align=left| Olympic Auditorium, Los Angeles
|align=left|
|-
|Win
|
|align=left| James Williamson
|TKO
|7
|03/11/1993
|align=left| Biloxi, Mississippi
|align=left|
|-
|Win
|
|align=left| Warren Williams
|UD
|10
|19/06/1993
|align=left| The Summit, Houston, Texas
|align=left|
|-
|Win
|
|align=left| Armando Rodriguez
|TKO
|1
|25/05/1993
|align=left| The Palace, Auburn Hills, Michigan
|align=left|
|-
|Win
|
|align=left| Lenzie Morgan
|UD
|12
|28/01/1993
|align=left| IMA Sports Arena, Flint, Michigan
|align=left|
|-
|Win
|
|align=left| Iceman John Scully
|UD
|12
|13/11/1992
|align=left| Thomas & Mack Center, Las Vegas, Nevada
|align=left|
|-
|Win
|
|align=left| Frankie Liles
|UD
|12
|07/07/1992
|align=left| Hollywood Palladium, Hollywood, California
|align=left|
|-
|Win
|
|align=left| Antoine Byrd
|PTS
|12
|03/03/1992
|align=left| HemisFair Arena, San Antonio, Texas
|align=left|
|-
|Win
|
|align=left| Willie Douglas
|PTS
|6
|18/01/1992
|align=left| Pennsylvania Hall, Philadelphia
|align=left|
|-
|Win
|
|align=left| Kenny Payne
|TKO
|4
|23/11/1991
|align=left| The Omni, Atlanta
|align=left|
|-
|Win
|
|align=left| Jerome Kelly
|TKO
|5
|17/09/1991
|align=left| The Palace, Auburn Hills, Michigan
|align=left|
|-
|Win
|
|align=left| Ernest Perry
|TKO
|1
|27/07/1991
|align=left| Norfolk Scope, Norfolk, Virginia
|align=left|
|-
|Win
|
|align=left| Ricardo Villa
|TKO
|4
|18/05/1991
|align=left| Reno-Sparks Convention Center, Reno, Nevada
|align=left|
|-
|Win
|
|align=left| Quirino Garcia
|KO
|3
|09/04/1991
|align=left| The Palace, Auburn Hills, Michigan
|align=left|
|-
|Win
|
|align=left| Ali Sanchez
|TKO
|7
|23/02/1991
|align=left| Caesars Palace, Las Vegas, Nevada
|align=left|
|-
|Win
|
|align=left| Willie Douglas
|UD
|8
|21/01/1991
|align=left| Harrah's Marina, Atlantic City, New Jersey
|align=left|
|-
|Win
|
|align=left| Sylvester White
|KO
|1
|12/11/1990
|align=left| Lakefront Arena, Baton Rouge, Louisiana
|align=left|
|-
|Win
|
|align=left| Danny Mitchell
|PTS
|8
|17/09/1990
|align=left| Atlantic City, New Jersey
|align=left|
|-
|Win
|
|align=left| Steve Langley
|UD
|8
|05/08/1990
|align=left| Trump Plaza Hotel and Casino, Atlantic City, New Jersey
|align=left|
|-
|Win
|
|align=left| Juan Ramon Perez
|TKO
|1
|08/07/1990
|align=left| Harrah's Reno, Reno, Nevada
|align=left|
|-
|Win
|
|align=left| Larry Wilkins
|TKO
|1
|01/06/1990
|align=left| Boardwalk Hall, Atlantic City, New Jersey
|align=left|
|-
|Win
|
|align=left| Tommy Clark
|TKO
|2
|19/05/1990
|align=left| Caesars Palace, Las Vegas, Nevada
|align=left|
|-
|Win
|
|align=left| Mike Serr
|TKO
|4
|10/03/1990
|align=left| The Dunes, Las Vegas, Nevada
|align=left|
|-
|Win
|
|align=left| John Tobin
|TKO
|2
|29/01/1990
|align=left| Trump Plaza Hotel and Casino, Atlantic City, New Jersey
|align=left|
|-
|Win
|
|align=left| Joe Wolf
|KO
|1
|13/11/1989
|align=left| Central Park Athletic Club, Milwaukee, Wisconsin
|align=left|
|}

References

External links
 

1964 births
Boxers from Connecticut
Living people
Super-middleweight boxers
People from Sharon, Connecticut
American male boxers